Taylor Elizabeth Louderman (born December 21, 1990) is an American actress, singer, and dancer. She is best known for originating the role of Regina George in the Broadway musical Mean Girls, for which she was nominated for the Tony Award for Best Actress in a Musical in 2018.

Early life and education
Louderman was born in Madison, Wisconsin, and then raised in Bourbon, Missouri, a small town 60 miles southwest of St. Louis, Missouri. She is the eldest daughter of Roger and Suzanne Louderman and has four sisters, Hannah, Olivia, Morgan, and Madison.

In 2001, at the age of 10, she was cast in the title role of Annie at Ozark Actors Theatre in Rolla, Missouri.

She graduated from Sullivan High School and then attended the University of Michigan for two years before leaving the program to star as Campbell in the touring production of Bring It On: The Musical. In 2020, she earned a Bachelor of Science degree in Liberal Arts from The New School.

Career
After her sophomore year at the University of Michigan, Louderman appeared as Margot in 2011 production of Legally Blonde at The Muny in St. Louis, Missouri. It was during this time she learned she had been cast as the lead role of Campbell in the touring production of Bring It On: The Musical. After its national tour, the show then transferred to Broadway in 2012 with Louderman, making her Broadway debut.

Louderman then appeared as Wendy Darling in NBC's 2014 live production of the musical Peter Pan.

She was next seen on Broadway in January 2017, taking over the role of Lauren in Kinky Boots.

Louderman starred as Regina George in the Tony Award-nominated Broadway musical, Mean Girls, written by Tina Fey with music and lyrics by Jeff Richmond and Nell Benjamin, respectively. The show had its world premiere as an out-of-town tryout at the National Theatre in Washington, D.C., from October 31, 2017, to December 3, 2017, in which Louderman originated the role of Regina George. The musical, which is based on the film of the same name, began previews on March 12, 2018, and officially opened on Broadway on April 8, 2018, at the August Wilson Theatre in New York City. She received nominations for numerous awards for this role, including nominations for the Tony Award for Best Actress in a Musical, the Drama League Award, and an Outer Critics Circle Award. Louderman announced via her Instagram that she would be departing Mean Girls on September 8, 2019.

In March 2019, it was reported that Louderman landed a leading role in a new CBS show, The Emperor of Malibu.

As part of The Muny's 101st season, Louderman reprised her role as Lauren in Kinky Boots in June 2019. Calvin Wilson, writing for the St. Louis Post-Dispatch, wrote of her performance: "...In a role that’s too small for her talent, Louderman is a sheer delight."

In July 2019, Louderman announced via her Instagram that, following the conclusion of her current projects, she would be taking a hiatus from performing to focus on writing, teaching, and producing. Posting on July 12, she captioned a photo of herself as Regina George with: "...I have to be honest..though I ask for forgiveness for expressing this if it’s not what you want to hear...I am ready. I am sad being in these shoes most days...still very grateful, but to the younger version of myself who dreamt this all up, I love you, please forgive me and thank you."

In February 2021, Louderman joined the cast of the NBC sitcom Kenan, playing the recurring role of Tami Greenlake.

Personal life
On December 24, 2019, Louderman was engaged to her boyfriend, Brooks Toth. On June 15, 2020, she announced on her Instagram account that she and Toth were married at Jupiter Lighthouse Park in Florida.
Louderman announced in August 2022 that she and Toth would be expecting their first child to arrive later that year. She gave birth to a son in early 2023.

Theatre credits
{| class="wikitable sortable" style="width:100%;"
|-
! Year
! Title
! Role
! Theatre
! Director(s)
! 
|- 
| 2001
| Annie
| Annie
| Ozark Actors Theatre 
| 
| 
|-
| 2008
| Joseph and the Amazing Technicolor Dreamcoat
| Ensemble
| rowspan=2| The Robert G. Reim Theatre
| 
| 
|-
| 2009
| Disney's Alice in Wonderland
| Rose
| 
| 
|-
| rowspan=3| 2010
| Beauty and the Beast
| Ensemble
| rowspan=2| The Muny
| 
| 
|-
| Footloose
| Ensemble
| 
| 
|-
| Aida
| Amneris
| Power Center for the Performing Arts
| 
| 
|-
| rowspan=3| 2011
| Legally Blonde
| Margot
| The Muny
| 
| 
|-
| rowspan=3| Bring It On: The Musical 
| rowspan=3| Campbell Davis
| Alliance Theatre
| rowspan=3| 
| 
|-
| U.S. National Tour
| 
|-
| 2012
| St. James Theatre
| 
|-
| 2013
| Footloose
| Ariel Moore
| Kansas City Starlight Theatre
| 
| 
|-
| rowspan=2| 2014
| rowspan=2|Grease
| rowspan=2| Sandy Dumbrowski
| Paper Mill Playhouse
| 
| 
|-
| rowspan=2|The Muny
| 
| 
|-
| rowspan=2| 2015
| Hairspray
| Amber Von Tussle
| 
| 
|-
| Gigantic
| Ashley Penrod
| Vineyard Theatre
| 
| 
|-
| 2016
| Aida
| Amneris
| The Muny
| 
| 
|- 
 -
 2016
 Ride the Cyclone    Ocean (briefly)
     MCC Theater Off-Broadway

| rowspan=2| 2017
| Kinky Boots | Lauren 
| Al Hirschfeld Theatre| 
| 
|-
| rowspan=2|  Mean Girls | rowspan=2| Regina George| National Theatre 
| rowspan=2| 
| 
|-
| 2018–19
| August Wilson Theatre'| 
|-
 
|2019
| Kinky Boots| Lauren
| The Muny
| 
| 
|}
• 

Filmography
Film

Television

Discography
Cast recordings and soundtracks
 Bring It On: The Musical – Original Broadway Cast Recording (2012)
 Peter Pan Live! – Soundtrack from the NBC television event (2014)
 Life of an Actress: The Musical – Original Motion Picture Soundtrack (2015)
 Mean Girls – Original Broadway Cast Recording (2018)

Collaborative projects
 Broadway's Carols for a Cure, Volume 14 (2012)
 Broadway's Carols for a Cure, Volume 20'' (2018)

As featured artist
 "Rockin' Around the Pole" by The Hot Elves (2018)
"Break From The Line" by Joey Contreras (2019)
 "Little Miss Perfect" by Joriah Kwamé (2019)

Awards and nominations

References

External links
 
 
 

American stage actresses
Living people
Actors from Madison, Wisconsin
University of Michigan alumni
American television actresses
21st-century American actresses
Actresses from St. Louis
1990 births